Maryna Masalska is a Ukrainian former football defender who played for Zhilstroy Kharkiv in the Ukrainian League and the European Cup. She was a member of the Ukrainian national team, taking part in the 2009 European Championship.

Honours
Ukrainian Women's League: 2012, 2013, 2014
Ukrainian Women's Cup: 2012, 2013

References

External links

1985 births
WFC Zhytlobud-1 Kharkiv players
Ukrainian women's footballers
Ukraine women's international footballers
Women's association football defenders
Living people